Wrangled is the second solo studio album by outlaw country singer and country music trio Pistol Annies member Angaleena Presley. It was released via Thirty Tigers Records on April 21, 2017.

Background
Wrangled contains several songs with noteworthy collaborations. "Dreams Don't Come True" reunites Presley with her Pistol Annies bandmates Ashley Monroe and Miranda Lambert. Chris Stapleton co-wrote "Only Blood", which features Stapleton's wife Morgane on vocals. Wanda Jackson, known as "Queen of Rockabilly," co-wrote "Good Girl Down" with Presley and Vanessa Olivarez. "Cheer Up Little Darling", a song Presley co-wrote with Guy Clark, was the final song Clark completed before he died on May 17, 2016. As a tribute, Shawn Camp played Clark's mandola and his No. 10 guitar (which was used to write the song). Audio of Clark reciting the first verse is heard in the song before Presley starts singing.

Critical reception

Wrangled received acclaim from music critics. At Metacritic, which assigns a normalized rating out of 100 to reviews from mainstream critics, the album has an average score of 83 out of 100 based on 8 reviews, which indicates "universal acclaim". Stephen Thomas Erlewine of AllMusic wrote that Presley "may emphasize her ties to the past but she's intent on expanding the tradition, turning country music into a bolder, more inclusive place, and that desire is what makes Wrangled such a compelling album."

Rolling Stone named Wrangled one of its Top 20 Albums of 2017.

Commercial performance
In the US, Wrangled debuted at No. 15 on Billboard'''s Heatseekers Albums chart, selling 1,300 copies in its first week. As of May 2017, Wrangled'' has sold 2,300 copies in the United States.

Track listing

Personnel
Credits adapted from AllMusic.

 Shawn Camp – acoustic guitar, mandola
 Guy Clark – recitation on "Cheer Up Little Darling"
 Walker County – background vocals
 Fred Eltringham – drums, handclapping, percussion
 Justin Francis – handclapping, stomping 
 Keith Gattis – baritone guitar, acoustic guitar, electric guitar, handclapping, mandolin, piano, Wurlitzer
 Jack Ingram – background vocals
 David Jacques – bass guitar, handclapping
 Miranda Lambert – background vocals
 Buckley Miller – castanets
 Ashley Monroe – background vocals
 Heather Morgan – background vocals
 Russ Pahl – banjo, steel guitar
 Charlie Pierce – handclapping, laughs
 Angaleena Presley – handclapping, stomping, toy piano, lead vocals
 Morgane Stapleton – background vocals
 Bradley Thornton – handclapping
 Chandler Thornton – handclapping
 Layne Thornton – handclapping
 Oran Thornton – handclapping, acoustic guitar, electric guitar, resonator guitar, Mellotron, Hammond organ, percussion, piano, snaps, stomping, background vocals, xylophone 
 Glenn Worf – bass guitar, upright bass, handclapping
 Craig Wright – drums, handclapping, percussion, snaps
 Chris Athens – mastering
 Keith Brogdon – artwork
 Becky Fluke – photography
 Justin Francis – assistant engineer
 Buckley Miller – engineer, mixing
 Jordan Powell – engineer
 Angaleena Presley – producer
 Oran Thornton – mixing, producer

Charts

Release history

References

2017 albums
Angaleena Presley albums